The Peru–Bolivian Confederation was a short-lived state that existed in South America between 1836 and 1839. The country was a loose confederation made up of three states: North Peru and South Peru—states that arose from the division of the Peruvian Republic due to the civil wars of 1834 and 1835 to 1836—as well as the Bolivian State.

The geographical limits of the Confederation varied over time, with Bolivia occupying and incorporating the disputed territories in northern Argentina in 1838. It also possessed de facto autonomous indigenous territories, such as Iquicha, all under the supreme command of Marshal Andrés de Santa Cruz, who assumed the position of Supreme Protector in 1836, while he was president of Bolivia.

Both Chile and Argentina opposed the Confederation as a potential military and economic threat, and for its support for dissidents in exile.

Argentina and Bolivia reached an agreement after their war over Tarija, and the Confederate Army was ultimately defeated by the United Restoration Army in the 1839 Battle of Yungay, which put an end to the War of the Confederation. Historian Jorge Basadre frames the confederation as part of a period of "determination of the nationalities" in western South America.

History

Background

At the beginning of the 19th century, Simón Bolívar postulated the idea of creating a great nation, coinciding with Andrés de Santa Cruz, who thought of uniting Peru and Bolivia in a single country, the latter colloquially known as Upper Peru. The idea of uniting both countries was the general idea of several influential political leaders in Peru—including Francisco Xavier de Luna Pizarro, Agustín Gamarra, among others—who sought to reintegrate the two Perus, disagreeing only in the form of the “union”: confederation or merger. An important factor in the desire to unite these two states were the historical ties between both regions, even after independence.

After political instability and a coup d'état in 1835, a civil war broke out between newly self-declared president Felipe Santiago Salaverry and constitutional president Luis José de Orbegoso, who allowed Bolivian president Andrés de Santa Cruz to send his troops through the Peruvian border. After the latter's triumph in 1836, assemblies were soon established to make way for the creation of the Confederation.

Establishment
Immediately, the representatives of the three states promised to celebrate the union pact of the Peru-Bolivian Confederation as soon as possible.

The Sicuani Assembly was established on March 16, 1836, and closed on March 22. It featured representatives from Ayacucho, Arequipa, Cuzco, Puno and Tacna. On April 10, Orbegoso recognized South Peru as an independent state through a decree, and a Supreme Court was installed in Cuzco on August 24. The assembly also created the country's flag and currency. Fines were put in place to prevent the (now North) Peruvian flag from being flown.

The Huaura Assembly lasted from August 3 to 24, 1836, and featured representatives from La Libertad, Lima, Maynas and Junín. On August 11, North Peru was officially established through the promulgation of its constitution by the then President Orbegoso, naming Santa Cruz—who triumphantly entered Lima on August 15—as the Supreme Protector of the state. Orbegoso also presented his resignation, but it was not approved by the assembly, who named him provisional president. The assembly also established the new territorial divisions of the country. Unlike it's new southern neighbour, North Peru maintained the national symbols of its predecessor.

In the case of Bolivia, a special session of the  had previously been held on June 21, 1836, which authorized Santa Cruz to complete the confederation project to which Bolivia had already adhered with the Law of July 22, 1835. Around that time, Santa Cruz received the diploma and insignia of Grand Officer of the Legion of Honour, with which the King of France honored him. He also received a communication from Pope Gregory XVI and a rosary with his medal, blessed by the Pope himself.

Provided, then, with all the legal elements granted by the assemblies of the three states, Santa Cruz decreed the establishment of the Peru-Bolivian Confederation, by decree given in Lima on October 28, 1836. A customs office was also opened in Arica, which employed both South Peruvians and Bolivians.

The  was signed without debate during the congress. It established the legal framework through which the state would operate, and also included the design of the flag. Reactions to the pact were mixed event among its signatories, and disagreements led to the establishment of one constituent congress per member state. The act was later promulgated in 1837.

Political instability and wars

Like Orbegoso, Santa Cruz also had many opponents and enemies born in the frequent caudillo clashes of the early years of Peru's republican history. Among those enemies were powerful characters such as Agustín Gamarra and Ramón Castilla, who at the time were exiled in Chile.

The rivalry that existed between the ports of Callao and Valparaíso worsened as a result of the establishment of the Confederation. A tariff war soon began between both states, and Orbegoso supported Ramón Freire's failed expedition against Diego Portales. The Congress of Chile approved the declaration of war on December 26, 1836, claiming that Santa Cruz's rule over Peru was illegitimate, and that his influence threatened the integrity of other South American nations, as seen by Orbegoso's support for the attempted invasion of Chile by Freire, specifically pointing out the attempt on Portales.

A territorial dispute between Argentina and Bolivia over the territory of Tarija escalated, as Bolivia occupied and annexed the territory and Juan Manuel de Rosas then declared war on the Confederation on May 19, 1837, accusing Santa Cruz of harboring supporters of the Unitarian Party. The accusations ended up being true, as Santa Cruz had financially supported the émigrés.

Portales was assassinated in Valparaíso after a mutiny broke out in Quillota, leading to preparations for the invasion of South Peru. Thus, the first "Restorative Expedition" left Valparaíso on September 15, 1837, landing in Quilca, and occupying Arequipa on October 12. The Confederate Navy captured the Juan Fernández Islands on November 14.

On November 17, after the Chileans were surrounded by Peruvian troops, the Treaty of Paucarpata was signed by Manuel Blanco Encalada under the guarantee of Great Britain, through which the occupation was undone six days later and the Peruvian ships captured by Chile were to be returned. After Blanco Encalada's troops arrived in Valparaíso, he was met with hostile demonstrations and the Chilean government repudiated the treaty of Paucarpata. A second expedition headed by Manuel Bulnes was organized, which left for Peru on July 19, 1838.

Dissolution

Around the same time, North Peru seceded from the Confederation on July 30, but was nevertheless attacked and defeated by the United Restoration Army in the Battle of Portada de Guías of August 21. Meanwhile Confederate troops in Callao were besieged by the same army.

During this time, the Confederation's stability collapsed, as by September, Peru (i.e. North and South Peru) was under the de jure control of seven different presidents at one time: Santa Cruz, who was the Supreme Protector; Gamara, the restorationist president; Orbegoso, leader of the secessionist North Peruvian state; José de la Riva Agüero, who replaced Orbegoso, being appointed by Santa Cruz; Pío de Tristán, president of South Peru; Domingo Nieto, in the north; and Juan Francisco de Vidal in Huaylas.

Santa Cruz occupied Lima on November 10, ending the siege in Callao, but left for the north, where the restaurateurs were located. He was defeated in the Battle of Yungay on January 20, 1839, and thus, the Confederation was dissolved, with Gamarra announcing its dissolution on August 25. The Confederate defeat led to the exile of Santa Cruz, first to Guayaquil, in Ecuador, then to Chile, and finally to Europe, where he died.

After the Confederation was defeated, loyalists such as Antonio Huachaca kept fighting against the new Peruvian government, being also defeated in November 1839.

Government and politics
In each of the Confederation's states, there was, from 1837 until the dissolution, a “provisional president” under Marshal Andrés de Santa Cruz, who was styled the “supreme protector” and was also president of Bolivia.

Bolivia
President: General José Miguel de Velasco

North Peru (also known as Republic of the North of Peru, or North-Peruvian Republic)
First President: General Luis Orbegoso (August 21, 1837 – July 30, 1838)
Second President: General José de la Riva Agüero (August 1, 1838 – January 24, 1839)

South Peru (also known as Republic of the South of Peru, or South-Peruvian Republic)
First President: General Ramón Herrera Rodado (b. 1799 – d. 1882) (September 17, 1837 – October 12, 1838)
Second President: Juan Pío de Tristán y Moscoso (b. 1773 – d. 1859) (October 12, 1838 – February 23, 1839)

Administrative divisions

Foreign relations
: after Bolivia occupied and annexed the disputed territory of Tarija, Argentina declared war on the Confederation on May 19, 1837. After the war ended, Argentina negotiated with the new Bolivian state over the territories, and Tarija ultimately remained in Bolivia.
 Chile: relations soured quickly after the establishment of the Confederation as Chile wanted to maintain its hegemony over trade in the South Pacific. Peruvian support for a failed naval invasion led to the declaration of war in 1836, which led to a Chilean-backed naval invasion in South Peru, through which relations were reestablished via the 1837 Treaty of Paucarpata.
 Ecuador: Vicente Rocafuerte, then president of Ecuador, presented a neutral position despite repeated attempts by Chile to get Ecuador to join the conflict, offering instead to act as a mediator. Despite this, according to J.P. Roldán, then Consul in Guayaquil, supporters of Juan José Flores were eager to join Chile in its war effort. Santa Cruz's government favoured Ecuador by sending subversive leaders José María Urvina and Juan Otamendi to Jauja, as well as interning subversive Ecuadorians to the Sierra. Ecuador had signed a treaty with the three member states of the Confederation, which was annulled by the Ecuadorian Congress in 1837 under Flores' influence. When the Confederation ceased to exist, its consulate in Guayaquil was transfered to the new Peruvian government.
: The British government acted as guarantor of the Treaty of Paucarpata of 1837. When the treaty was annulled, the Consul General notified the Chilean government of Queen Victoria's disapproval of the continuation of the war. Then chargé d'affaires Belford Hinton Wilson made demands to guarantee the safety of British goods in Lima, which were later moved to Callao.
: When pressed by Chilean minister Ventura Lavalle to join the conflict, then president Francisco de Paula Santander expressed his belief that, despite him agreeing with Chile over the threat the state posed to the region (and his personal disliking of Santa Cruz's government and person), the state was doomed due to its dysfunctionality between Santa Cruz's government and Peruvian elements in Bolivia, and recommended that he accept the Ecuadorian mediation so that the war could end.

See also
War of the Confederation
Gran Colombia – Bolívar's Federation
Federal Republic of Central America – another federal state on the American continent that underwent a similar fate.

Notes

References

Bibliography

External links
List of Peruvian heads of state at WorldStatesmen.org.

 
Former countries in South America
War of the Confederation
19th century in Bolivia
1836 in Bolivia
1838 in Bolivia
1839 in Bolivia
1836 in Peru
1838 in Peru
1839 in Peru
1830s establishments in Bolivia
1830s establishments in Peru
States and territories disestablished in 1839
Pan-Americanism
1836 establishments in South America
1839 disestablishments in South America
1837 in South America